Paul Koslo (born Manfred Koslowski; June 27, 1944 – January 9, 2019) was a German-born Canadian actor.

Career

Koslo started his career in such 1970s films as Nam's Angels a.k.a. The Losers, Vanishing Point and The Stone Killer. He also appeared opposite Charlton Heston in the science fiction film The Omega Man, in a sympathetic co-starring role. He portrayed villains in Joe Kidd (1972), Mr. Majestyk (1974), and The Drowning Pool (1975).

He and fellow Omega Man co-star Anthony Zerbe also appeared in Rooster Cogburn (1975). After a solid supporting part as a Jewish concentration camp survivor in the critically acclaimed Voyage of the Damned (1976), as well as the mayor in Heaven's Gate (1980), he began a long run of portraying villainous types in productions such as Roots: The Next Generations and The Glitter Dome. In rare, in-depth interviews with both Psychotronic Video and Shock Cinema (issue No. 14) magazines, Koslo spoke (mostly unfavorably) about his experiences working in several films with Charles Bronson and in The Omega Man with Heston.
 
Starting in the late 1970s, Koslo appeared (usually as a villain) in a string of television shows such as The Rockford Files, Mission: Impossible, Barnaby Jones, The Incredible Hulk, Quincy, M.E., Buck Rogers in the 25th Century, T. J. Hooker, The A-Team, The Fall Guy, Dallas and Hunter. In the Highway to Heaven episode "The Torch" he played a leader of the American Nazi Party. Koslo found it tough to deliver his character's often bigotry-riddled dialogue, and during the filming of a scene set at a Nazi rally the cast and crew were heckled by passers-by, since the scene was filmed on location in downtown Los Angeles with swastikas decorating the outside of a building. He also appeared as Jesse James in The Dukes of Hazzard seventh-season episode "Go West, Young Dukes".

In the 1980s, along with television appearances, he appeared in several independent action films (most of them straight-to-video). He was also in Loose Cannons (1990) and appeared as the Russian battle-robot pilot Alexander in the science fiction film Robot Jox (1990).

Personal life
Koslo met his wife, Allaire Paterson, at the MET Theatre in Hollywood, when he produced a one-woman show, Purple Breasts, a critically acclaimed play she co-wrote and starred in. They married in 1997 and had one child together.

Koslo died on January 9, 2019, from pancreatic cancer at the age of 74.

Filmography

Film

Television

References

Further reading

External links

1944 births
2019 deaths
Canadian male film actors
Canadian male television actors
Deaths from cancer in California
Deaths from pancreatic cancer
German emigrants to Canada